Mark Stevens (born 1960) is an American billionaire venture capitalist, and a partner at S-Cubed Capital in Menlo Park, California. He was previously with Intel and Sequoia Capital. He serves on the board of Nvidia, and is an investor in the Golden State Warriors of the National Basketball Association.

Education and career
Stevens earned bachelor's and master's degrees from the University of Southern California, and an MBA from Harvard Business School. During his time at USC, Stevens was a member of the Phi Kappa Psi fraternity.

Career
Stevens joined Intel in 1982, then a mid-sized company about to capitalize on the PC boom. He joined as a technical salesperson and worked in a variety of marketing and sales roles while also earning his master's degree in Computer Engineering from USC. He left in 1987 to receive his MBA from Harvard Business School.

In 1989, Stevens became a partner at Sequoia Capital and began to concentrate on semiconductor, software, and systems-related investments.  Over the years, he became a rising star on Forbes magazine's Midas List of top 100 venture capitalists, climbing as high as 10th place. He served as a director of at least 12 companies during this time.

Stevens was previously one of the five voting partners at Sequoia Capital who were jointly responsible for some of the high-tech industry's most successful investments: Google, Yahoo!, Nvidia, YouTube, and others. He is the founder of and currently affiliated with S-Cubed capital.

Philanthropy
In 2004, Stevens and his wife Mary donated $22 million to the University of Southern California and to help found the USC Stevens Institute for Technology Commercialization to advance engineering within the USC Viterbi School of Engineering. It was later renamed USC Stevens Center for Innovation, having expanded its scope to include other disciplines.

In 2015, Stevens and his wife donated $50 million to endow and name the USC Mark and Mary Stevens Neuroimaging and Informatics Institute. The Institute's goal is to enhance knowledge of brain science through the application of imaging and information technologies. In 2017, the Institute received FDA clearance for clinical use of the first seven-Tesla MRI scanner in North America. In 2019, the Institute, along with the Michael J. Fox Foundation for Parkinson's Research, announced the addition of more than 108 terabytes of RNA sequencing data to its open access portal associated with the Parkinson's Progression Markers Initiative.

Stevens is a member of the USC Viterbi School of Engineering Board of Councilors and, since 2001, the USC Board of Trustees. He previously served on the board of trustees of the Menlo School in Menlo Park, California.

Golden State Warriors
Stevens became an investor in the Golden State Warriors of the NBA in 2013 by purchasing shares formerly held by Vivek Ranadive. He was ejected from Oracle Arena during Game 3 of the 2019 NBA Finals, after an altercation with Kyle Lowry of the Toronto Raptors. The Warriors, as well as the league, eventually banned Stevens for a year from all games, arenas, and team activities. He was also fined $500,000 for the incident. Stevens reached out to Lowry and attempted to directly apologize to him along with other members of the Raptors and Warriors organizations and he expressed gratitude to those who accepted his calls. A 2016 New York Times analysis of the team's value suggested it had more than doubled from Stevens’ 2013 investment.

References

External links
 USC Stevens Institute for Innovation (USC Stevens)

1960 births
American billionaires
American philanthropists
Giving Pledgers
21st-century philanthropists
Golden State Warriors owners
Harvard Business School alumni
Intel people
American venture capitalists
USC Viterbi School of Engineering alumni
Living people
People from Atherton, California
University of Southern California alumni